Margot Kalinke (23 April 1909 in Barcin, Poland – 25 November 1981 in Munich, West Germany) was a German politician of the German Party and later the Christian Democratic Union (CDU).

Biography 
Expelled from Poland in 1925, Margot Kalinke was Protestant by faith.  From 1937 to 1952 she was managing director of a Angestelltenkrankenkasse ("Employee Health Insurance Company") in Hanover.  In 1946 she became a founder of the Verband Weiblicher Angestellter (VWA, "Association of Women Employees") having been active in a predecessor organisation since 1933. From 1949 until her death, she was chair of the VWA. From 1953 to 1974, she was director of the Office of Private Health Insurance. She belonged briefly to the Executive Board of the Bundesversicherungsanstalt für Angestellte ("Federal Insuranceoffice for Employees") and in the 1950s, was a member of the Advisory Council for Reorganisation of Social Services at the office of the Ministry of Labour.

Politics 
From 1946 to 1949, Kalinke was a member of the Lower Saxony State Parliament.  In 1947 and 1948, she was also a member of the Zonenbeirat ("Area Advisory Board").

From 1949 to 1953, and then from 1955 until 1972, she was a member of the German Bundestag, winning the election in the Celle constituency in 1957.  Together with Ernst August Farke she represented the Arbeitnehmerflügel ("Worker's Wing") of the German Party in parliament.  From 1955 to 1957 she was deputy chair of the Bundestag Committee for Public Welfare. From 1957 until her exit from the party on 1 June 1960, she was vice chair of the German Party.

She joined the Christian Democratic Union on 20 September 1960, and from 1969 to 1971 she was Landesvorsitzende ("State President") of the women's union in Lower Saxony.

Equal rights 
Unlike most women in her party, Margot Kalinke opposed the "Stitch Ruling" (pertaining to the rights of the husband in marital disputes).  Together with Elisabeth Schwarzhaupt she orchestrated support for an opposition amendment to her own party's bill.  The Gesetz über die Gleichstellung von Mann und Frau auf dem Gebiet des bürgerlichen Rechts ("Law of Equality between Man and Woman in Civil Law") was enacted on 18 June 1957 without the Stitch Clause.

Sources 
This article was translated from the equivalent article in the German Wikipedia on 9 July 2009.
Vor 50 Jahren ("50 years ago"), Die Zeit, published 9 November 2000, retrieved 22 July 2016.

External links 

1909 births
1981 deaths
German Party (1947) politicians
Women members of State Parliaments in Germany
Members of the Landtag of Lower Saxony
Female members of the Bundestag
Members of the Bundestag for Lower Saxony
20th-century German women politicians
Knights Commander of the Order of Merit of the Federal Republic of Germany
Members of the Bundestag for the Christian Democratic Union of Germany
Members of the Bundestag 1969–1972
Members of the Bundestag 1965–1969
Members of the Bundestag 1961–1965
Members of the Bundestag 1957–1961
Members of the Bundestag 1953–1957
Members of the Bundestag 1949–1953